Trial and error is a general method of problem solving.

Trial and error may also refer to:

Music
Trial & Error Records, an Australian record label
Trial and Error (album), a 2009 album by singer/songwriter Nathan Stickman
Trial & Error (album), an album by the rapper Classified
"Trial and Error", a song from Absolute Design by Engel
"Trial and Error", a song from White Darkness by Nightingale

Film and television
Trial and Error (1962 film), a British comedy film starring Peter Sellers
Trial & Error (1993 film), a TV movie starring Tim Matheson
Trial and Error (1997 film), an American film starring Jeff Daniels
Trial and Error (TV series), an American sitcom aired on CBS in 1988
Trial & Error (TV series),  an American sitcom airing on NBC in 2017

Literature
Trial and Error (book), a 1933 book on writing and the publishing industry by Jack Woodford
Trial and Error (novel), a 1937 mystery novel by Anthony Berkeley
 Trial and Error: The American Civil Liberties Union and Its Impact on Your Family, by George Grant

Other
Trial & Error (company), a Hong Kong entertainment company

See also
Trials & Errors, a 2005 live album by the Magnolia Electric Co